Charles Kendall Wilson (1862 – 19 November 1934) was a Reform Party Member of Parliament in New Zealand.

He was born in Sydney, Australia and came to New Zealand aged 16 with his parents.

He was elected to the Taumarunui electorate in the 1911 general election, but was defeated in 1914.

His widow Helen Wilson wrote a highly regarded autobiography in which she recalls the bidding by the liquor trade for him to vote against or even just abstain on a 1910 bill which provided that only a 55-45 percent majority of the vote would be needed to bring in Prohibition. The Trade offered to pay his election expenses, and rose to expenses plus eight hundred pounds, but then they found cheaper support. She said: my husband was incorruptible.

References

1862 births
1934 deaths
Reform Party (New Zealand) MPs
Unsuccessful candidates in the 1914 New Zealand general election
Members of the New Zealand House of Representatives
New Zealand MPs for North Island electorates
Politicians from Sydney
Australian emigrants to New Zealand
New Zealand farmers
Local politicians in New Zealand
20th-century New Zealand politicians